Dophla evelina, the red-spot duke, is a species of brush-footed butterfly found in Cambodia and South and Southeast Asia (Sri Lanka, Yunnan and India to the Philippines and Sulawesi). Many subspecies are accepted. The species was first described by Caspar Stoll in 1790.

Description

Male upperside somewhat dark metallic green. Forewing: cell with two median sinuous short black transverse lines with a crimson spot between them, two similar lines beyond, one before, one after apex of cell; followed by a dark irregular transverse shading between the veins; apex of wing broadly and termen narrowly edged with an obscure dark shading. Hindwing with a slender black loop in cell; very obscure discal and sub terminal dark macular bands and the anterior third of the wing purplish.

Underside sap green, largely suffused with plumbeous grey. Forewing has the transverse black slender lines and crimson spot as on the upperside; a very obscure subterminal series of dark spots parallel to terminal margin. Hindwing has three crimson spots encircled by slender black loops near base, and a very obscure subterminal series of dark spots in continuation of that on the forewing, but obsolescent posteriorly. Antennae brown; head with a crimson streak behind the eyes; thorax and abdomen greenish brown, beneath greyish.

Female very similar, with precisely similar markings above and below, but the ground colour on upperside paler and especially pale on the terminal halves of the wings, in contrast with the darker basal portions.

Subspecies laudabilis C. Swinhoe: The southern Indian continental representative of D. evelina seems to form a very distinct race. The male differs in the costa of the forewing on the upperside beyond the dark obscure discal band being broadly greyish white with a silvery lustre up to a little distance before the apex of the wing; this colour spreads downwards diffusely, but does not extend below vein 6. In the female there is a similar patch, very wide on the costa, extending as a broad transverse band with outer diffuse and inner sinuous margin right across the wing to vein 1; on the hindwing it is not represented by a very much narrower transverse diffuse band or irroration of grey scales. Underside male and female, as in the typical form, but more densely suffused with plumbeous grey. Antennae, head, thorax and abdomen as in the typical form.

Life history

Larva: The larva of D. e. laudabilis feeds on Diospyros candolleana (Ebenaceae), and is green with a vinaceous (red-wine color) dorsal patch on each segment, enclosing a whitish dark-centred eyespot. These patches vary in size, those on the fourth, seventh and tenth segments being usually the largest, and those on the fifth and sixth small or obsolete.

Pupa: "Green, with silver spots and a bright line of the same colour along the sides of the dorsal triangle."

At least on Borneo but probably elsewhere too, adults are frequently seen drinking juices from old fruits. They indiscriminately seek out such sources of nutrition, whether these are in the shade of the forest or in drier and sunnier open areas.

Footnotes

References
 
 Hamer, K. C.; Hill, J. K.; Benedick, S.; Mustaffa, N.; Chey, V. K. & Maryati, M. (2006). "Diversity and ecology of carrion- and fruit-feeding butterflies in Bornean rain forest". Journal of Tropical Ecology. 22: 25–33. 

Limenitidinae
Butterflies of Asia
Butterflies of Borneo
Butterflies described in 1790